Tirathaba irrufatella is a species of moth of the family Pyralidae. It was described by Émile Louis Ragonot in 1901. It is found in Japan.

References 

Tirathabini
Moths described in 1901